Christianity in Uzbekistan is a minority religion, accounting for 2.3% of the population or 630,000 according to a 2010 study by Pew Research Center.

History
Historically, Uzbekistan had communities of Eastern Christians, including Nestorians and Jacobites (historically associated with miaphysitism). Around the 14th century, Christianity began rapidly declining. Factors to the decline included a plague that spread into the region which killed off much of the Christian communities living there. Remaining Christians probably converted to Islam due to economic reasons. Under the Timurids, the political situation likely exacerbated the already struggling community.

The last Christians in Samarkand and Central Asia were reportedly persecuted by his grandson, Ulugh Beg. However, due to a lack of reliable records, the details surrounding the decline of the Syriac Christians of the area remains obscure.

Christianity returned to the region after the Russian conquest in 1867, when Orthodox churches were built in large cities, to serve Russian and European settlers and officers.

According to a 2009 US State Department release, about 5% of the population of Uzbekistan are Orthodox Christians, most of whom are ethnic Russians. According to a 2010 study by Pew Research Center 2.5% of the population of Uzbekistan are Orthodox Christians. There are about 4,000 Roman Catholics in Uzbekistan. New parishes cannot register.  In 2006 a law, by which printing religious books can be punished with three years, came.

The government indulges in massive persecution of Christians. There is strong pressure on Christians from a Muslim background in remote areas.  Uzbekistan was designated to its list of countries of particular concern of the U.S. State Department.

Christian converts
A 2015 study estimates some 10,000 believers in Christ from a Muslim background in the country, most of them belonging to some sort of evangelical or charismatic Protestant community.

Protestants
Protestants are less than one percent of the population. The Evangelical Lutheran Church in Uzbekistan has seven parishes. The seat of the bishop is Tashkent. The president of the synod is Gilda Razpopova.

Denominations
Baptist Union in Uzbekistan
German Evangelical Lutheran Church
Korean Baptist Churches
Korean Methodist Church
Korean Presbyterian church
Seventh-day Adventist Church

Jehovah's Witnesses
Jehovah’s Witnesses were present in Uzbekistan for decades before the country became an independent nation in 1991. Since 1992 Uzbekistan authorities continue to deny legal registration to all congregations of Jehovah’s Witnesses except for one in Chirchik. There are estimated to be 500 followers of the religious organization just in Chirchik alone. Under Uzbek law, Jehovah's Witnesses have a right to hold meetings only in the Kingdom Hall, while any religious propaganda is prohibited.

See also
Religion in Uzbekistan
Roman Catholicism in Uzbekistan
Russian Orthodox Church in Uzbekistan
Eastern Orthodoxy in Uzbekistan
Protestantism in Uzbekistan
Human rights in Uzbekistan#Freedom of religion

References

Source of the list: The World Christian Encyclopedia, Second edition, volume 1, p. 795